Taebaeksansŏng station is a railway station in Sansŏng-ri, P‘yŏngsan County, North Hwanghae province, North Korea. It is on the P'yŏngbu Line, which was formed from part of the Kyŏngŭi Line to accommodate the shift of the capital from Seoul to P'yŏngyang. Though this line physically connects P'yŏngyang to Pusan via Dorasan, in operational reality it ends at Kaesŏng due to the Korean Demilitarized Zone.

History
The station was opened by the Chosen Government Railway on 20 December 1931 as P'yŏngsan station. It was renamed in July 1945, taking its name from the nearby Taebaeksan Fortress (No. 93 on the list of DPRK National Treasures).

References

Railway stations in North Korea
Pyongsan County